Helen Bray (November 25, 1889 – October 15, 1990) was a Missouri-born American actress who appeared in several silent films during the early 20th century.

Bray is the great-grandmother of actress Michelle Pierce, who appears now in the TV show NCIS.

Filmography

 Little Miss Optimist (1917)
 Big Timber (1917)
 Whose Baby? (1917)
 A Maiden's Trust (1917)
 The Nick of Time Baby (1916)
 Safety First Ambrose (1916)
 Haystacks and Steeples (1916)
 The Danger Girl (1916)
 Her Stepchildren (1915)
 Woman Without a Soul (1915)
 Bob's Love Affairs (1915)
 The Girl Who Didn't Forget (1915)
 The Mystery of Henri Villard (1915)
 Under Two Flags (1915)
 The Wives of Men (1915)
 The Divided Locket (1915)
 Truth Stranger Than Fiction (1915)
 Felix Holt (1915)
 A Double Winning (1915)
 The Test of Sincerity (1915)
 On the Heights (1914)
 Little Miss Make-Believe (1914)
 The Dole of Destiny (1914)

External links

1889 births
1990 deaths
American film actresses
American silent film actresses
American centenarians
20th-century American actresses
Actresses from Missouri
Women centenarians